Doris Jacob (born 16 December 1981) is a Nigerian sprinter who specializes in the 400 metres.

Duah finished seventh in 4 x 400 metres relay at the 1997 World Championships, together with teammates Olabisi Afolabi, Fatima Yusuf and Falilat Ogunkoya. Participating in this event at the 2000 Summer Olympics, the team with Jacob, Afolabi, Rosemary Okafor and Charity Opara set a national record of 3:22.99 minutes in their heat.  Jacob also helped win a bronze medal at the 2002 Commonwealth Games. 

On the individual level, Jacob won a silver medal at the 2003 All-Africa Games and a bronze medal at the 1999 Summer Universiade, the latter in a personal best time of 51.04 seconds.

Achievements

External links

1981 births
Living people
Nigerian female sprinters
Athletes (track and field) at the 2000 Summer Olympics
Olympic athletes of Nigeria
Athletes (track and field) at the 2002 Commonwealth Games
Commonwealth Games bronze medallists for Nigeria
Commonwealth Games medallists in athletics
African Games silver medalists for Nigeria
African Games medalists in athletics (track and field)
Universiade medalists in athletics (track and field)
Athletes (track and field) at the 2003 All-Africa Games
Universiade bronze medalists for Nigeria
Medalists at the 1999 Summer Universiade
Olympic female sprinters
20th-century Nigerian women
21st-century Nigerian women
Medallists at the 2002 Commonwealth Games